Aleksandr Georgievich Martyshkin (26 August 1943 – 29 October 2021) was a Russian rower who competed for the Soviet Union in the 1968 Summer Olympics and in the 1972 Summer Olympics.

He was born in Moscow.

In 1968 he was a crew member of the Soviet boat which won the bronze medal in the eight event.

Four years later he finished fourth with the Soviet boat in the eight competition.

References

External links
 

1943 births
2021 deaths
Rowers from Moscow
Russian male rowers
Soviet male rowers
Olympic rowers of the Soviet Union
Rowers at the 1968 Summer Olympics
Rowers at the 1972 Summer Olympics
Olympic bronze medalists for the Soviet Union
Olympic medalists in rowing
World Rowing Championships medalists for the Soviet Union
Medalists at the 1968 Summer Olympics
European Rowing Championships medalists